The Belgorod–Bogodukhov offensive operation (3 August 1943 – 23 August 1943) was a combat operation executed as part of Operation Polkovodets Rumyantsev by the Red Army against the  Wehrmacht forces. It was one of the operations that was launched in response to the German offensive Operation Citadel.

Prelude
During the Battle of Kursk, German armored units south of the Kursk salient failed to penetrate the defences between the Voronezh and Steppe Fronts in the Belgorod sector. The Red Army's Operation Polkovodets Rumyantsev followed Operation Citadel and included as its objectives the immediate liberation of Belgorod, assigned to the Voronezh and Steppe Fronts. On July 23, German forces of the XI Army Corps returned to their old, well fortified positions on both sides of Belgorod. Their combat strength had been reduced by as much as 50% following the Battle.

Offensive operation 
Early on 3 August 1943, the Forces of the Voronezh and Steppe Fronts  advancing on a wide front between Sumy and former Volchansk (175 km), crossed the Vorskla river & quickly penetrated the defences of the 332nd Infantry Division & 167th Infantry Division to a depth of 100 km between Tomarovka & Belgorod on the northern flank, and as far as Bogodukhov sweeping aside the weakened 19th Panzer Division. By 5 August Belgorod which was defended by XI Armeecorps (Raus) was also being surrounded and isolated, requiring attempts by the German Armeeabteilung Kempf and 4th Panzerarmee Armies to relieve the garrison which was ordered by Hitler to defend the city. General Raus explains:

While the German intention was to "pinch off" the Red Army's offensive thrust at the base of the penetration between Borisovka and Grayvoron south of Vorskla river, the rapid tempo of the Steppe and Voronezh Fronts offensive meant that by the time the counter-attacks were executed the city had been evacuated on 6 August, and German forces were now defending Kharkov. The Wehrmacht's Mobile Forces were heading into an encounter with the main thrust of the Soviet Front tank armies. The German counter-attacks were carried out by the III Panzercorps of the Armeeabteilung "Kempf" in the Olshany area, and the XLVIII Panzercorps of the 4th Panzerarmee in the two-pincer manoeuvre of the Krasnokutsk and Akhtyrka areas. In the fighting that took place on both sides of the Merla & Merchik rivers, the superiority of the German Panzer Divisions was clearly evident, in spite of being involved in combat operations continuously since the 5th of July. Whilst 5th SS Panzer Division 'Wiking' & 3rd Panzer Division conducted primarily defensive operations, 2nd SS Panzer Division 'Das Reich', 3rd SS Panzer Division 'Totenkopf' repeatedly blunted attacks of Soviet elements south of the rivers and Bogodukhov. As at Prokhorovka, the Russians enjoyed tremendous numerical superiority in tanks. Both 1st Tank Army & 5th Guards Tank Army began the operations with over 500 tanks each, while the SS Divisions never had more than about 30-50 tanks each at any time during August. In spite of this, all Soviet attempts to penetrate to the railroad line were repulsed with bloody losses in men and tremendous loss in tanks. Katukov's 1st Tank Army thrusts south of the Merchik were repeatedly cut off & destroyed by III Panzercorps. The attempts by Rotmistrov's 5th Guards Tank Army Army to penetrate to the rail line from east of Bogodukhov were frustrated by 3rd Panzer Division & 'Wiking', with key defensive fighting by elements of 'Das Reich'. 'Totenkopf' executed a masterful attack that cut off elements of infantry and armour from the 27th Army & 6th Guards Army south of Krasnokutsk and then rolled down the line of supply toward Kolomak, south of Konstantinovka. Subsequent attacks encircled disorganized elements of several Russian Divisions and destroyed major portions of them after brief fighting. Subsequently, 'Totenkopf' drove to the Merla & forced a crossing of that river and linked up with 4th Panzerarmee spearheads at Parchomovka. However Großdeutschland was forced to withdraw from that town by Soviet pressure on its Northern flank, & this success could not be followed up.

Aftermath
After Belgorod was retaken on 6 August 1943 by the 69th and 7th Guards Armies of the Steppe Front the way was clear to concentrate forces for the Soviet offensive on Kharkov.

Footnotes
XI Armeecorps suffered the following casualties during the Battle of Kursk. 106th Infantry Division - 3,244 (forty-six officers), 320th Infantry Division - 2,839 (thirty officers) & 168th Infantry Division - 2,671 (127 officers) a Total of 8,754 combat effective soldiers.
Consisting of the 1st Guards Tank Army, 5th Guards Tank Army, 6th Guards Army, 5th Guards Army, 40th Army, 69th Army, 7th Guards Army, 27th Army.
by the German 168th Infantry Division.

Citations and notes

References

 Nipe, George M. Jr., Decision in the Ukraine: Summer 1943, II SS & III Panzerkorps, J.J. Fedorowicz Publishing, 1996 
 Newton, Steven H., Panzer Operations: The Eastern Front Memoir of General Raus 1941–1945, Da Capo Press, 2003 
 Ziemke, Earl F., Stalingrad to Berlin: The German Defeat in the East, Dorset Press, 1968

Battles and operations of the Soviet–German War
Conflicts in 1943
1943 in the Soviet Union
Battles of World War II involving Germany
History of Belgorod
July 1943 events
August 1943 events